Metharath University or Shinawatra University (SIU) is a private international university in Thailand, established by Dr.Thaksin Shinawatra and his colleagues. The campus was designed and developed by Soontorn Boonyatikarn in 1997. The Ministry of Universities granted the license for operation in 1999. The first Shinawatra University Council Meeting was held on 19 May 2000, and the first batch of students was admitted in September 2002. As of 2018, the university had students and faculty members of over 30 nationalities.

Presidents
 1999–2000 Police Captain Prof. Dr. Purachai Piumsomboon
 2000–2002 Sangsan Panich (Acting President)
 2002–2003 Wittaya Manawanicharoen (Acting President)
 2003–2004 Thanong Bidaya (Acting President)
 2004–2008 Prof. Prida Wibulswas
 2008–2009 Prof. Somchart Sophonronnarit
 2009–2011 Kittiratt Na-Ranong
 2011–2012 Asst. Prof. Prinya Tantaswadi (Acting President)
 2012–2015 Prof. Voradej Chandarasorn
 2015–present Associate Prof. Dr. Boonsom Lerdhirunwong

University council
 Paron Israsena Na Ayudhaya, Chairman
 M.D. Prommin Lertsuridej, Vice Chairman
 Pensom Damapong, Member
 Prasit Tansuwan, Member
 Doris Gold Wibunsin, Member
 Professor Damrong Khummongkol, Member
 Associate Professor Ake Chaisawadi, Member
 Associate Professor Pira Chirasopone, Member
 Pollasanha Positong, Member
 Associate Professor Thanmanustanun Phaniphuk, Member
 Associate Professor Sugree Charoensook, Member
 Chantavit Sujatanond, Member
 Professor Emeritus Sophon Roengsumran, Member
 General Charupat Ruangsuwan, Member
 Prof. Voradej Chandarasorn, Member
 Prayuth Swadriokul, Secretary

Courses

School of Information Technology
 B.Sc Computer Science

The undergraduate program is conducted at the Pathum Thani Campus.

 Master of Science Program in Information Technology
 Master of Science Degree in Information Technology (Thai Program)

School of Management
 Bachelor's Degree in Business Administration (BBA)
 Master's Degree in Business Administration (International Program) 
 Master's Degree in Business Administration (Thai Program) 
 Doctor of Philosophy Program in Management (International Program)

School of Management Technology
 Bachelor of Science in Management Technology (BSMT)

Options: 
 Architectural Technology Management
 Energy and Environment Management
 Building and Facility Management
 Master of Science in Management Technology (MSMT)
 PhD in Management Technology

School of Liberal Arts

 Bachelor of Arts Program in Liberal Arts (BALA)
 Master of Education in Teaching English as International Language (MedTEIL)
 Master of Art in Media, Information and Communication

Main campus
The main campus is in Pathum Thani Province, 50 kilometers from Bangkok. Its buildings received both the Asia Energy Award and the Energy Efficient Building 2003 Award.

Computer facilities

Classrooms contain computers and LCD visualizers connected to projectors. The university a fast Internet connection and Wi-Fi available in all buildings. Students are provided with accounts, e-mail facilities, and Web space.

Laboratories include:
 Apple Laboratory, with iMac, iPad2, iPod Touch devices and a projector, on the ground floor of the main academic building,
 Architectural and Environmental Design Studio with computer-aided design (CAD) software, on the fifth floor of the main academic building,
 Computer Networking, Operating System and Microprocessor Laboratory, on the third floor of the main academic building,
 Computer Programming Laboratory, on the third floor of the main academic building,
 Electronics and Circuits Laboratory, on the second floor of the laboratory building,
 General Computer Laboratory with printers, on the third floor of the main academic building,
 Language Laboratories, on the third floor of the main academic building and on the ground floor of the dormitory.

Dormitories 
First-year students are required to stay in the air-conditioned dormitories on Pathumthani campus during the semesters and summer sessions. There are separate facilities for men and women. Computer network and telephone connections are available in each room. On each floor there is a students' common room.

Activities 
Activities are usually organized through student clubs with elected executives. The clubs organize and manage activities related to academic affairs, culture, social events, and sports. The university partially subsidizes student activities.

The clubs are separated into four groups:

Sports
 Board Game Club
 Football (Soccer) Club
 Volleyball Club
 Badminton Club
 Paddle Boat Club
 Sanitation Club

Music
 Music Club
 Classical Thai Music Club
 SIU Radio Station Club

Academic affairs
 English Club
 Computers Club

Arts, cultures and religion
 Muslims Club
 International Club

Library

The Shinawatra University Library uses the Library of Congress classification system. Search via the Internet is supported.
The library implemented RFID (radio frequency identification) book handling technology in December 2002, the first in Thailand to do so.

References

External links
 Shinawatra University
 Education and language education in Thailand - Bangkok post http://www.bangkokpost.com/education/site2002/cvmy0702.htm

Buildings and structures in Pathum Thani province
Private universities and colleges in Thailand
Educational institutions established in 1996
1996 establishments in Thailand